Captain Jenkins can refer to:

 Robert Jenkins (master mariner), a British sailor tortured by his Spanish captors by the removal of an ear. 
 War of Jenkins' Ear, the ensuing war between the two states caused by the incident.